The  is the second home video game console of SNK Corporation's Neo Geo family, released on September 9, 1994, four years after its cartridge-based equivalent. The system can also play Audio CDs. All three versions of the system have no region-lock. The Neo Geo CD was launched bundled with a control pad instead of a joystick like the AES version. However, the original AES joystick can be used with all three Neo Geo CD models.

The Neo Geo CD had met with limited success due to it being plagued with slow loading times that could vary from 30 to 60 seconds between loads, depending on the game.

As of March 1997, there had been 570,000 Neo Geo CD units sold worldwide.

History 

The Neo Geo CD was first unveiled at the 1994 Tokyo Toy Show. The console uses the same CPU set-up as the arcade and cartridge-based Neo Geo systems, facilitating conversions. SNK planned to release Neo Geo CD versions of every Neo Geo game still in the arcades.

Three versions of the Neo Geo CD were released:

 A front-loading version, only distributed in Japan, with 25,000 total units built.
 A top-loading version, marketed worldwide, as the most common model.
 The Neo Geo CDZ, an upgraded, faster-loading version, released in Japan only.

The front-loading version is the original console design, with the top-loading version having been developed shortly before the Neo Geo CD launch as a scaled-down, cheaper alternative model.

Approximately one month after launch, SNK reported that they had sold the Neo Geo CD's entire initial shipment of 50,000 units.

Criticism of the system's generally long loading times began even before launch; a report in Electronic Gaming Monthly on the Neo Geo CD's unveiling noted, "At the show, they were showing a demo of Fatal Fury 2. The prototype of the machine that they showed was single speed, and the load time was 14-28 seconds between rounds. You can see that the screen[shot] on the right is a load screen."

In response to criticism of the Neo Geo CD's long load times, SNK planned to produce a model with a double speed CD-ROM drive for North America, compared to the single speed drive of the Japanese and European models. However, the system missed its planned North American launch date of October 1995, and while SNK declined to give a specific reason for the delay, in their announcement of the new January 1996 launch date they stated that they had decided against using a double speed drive. Their Japanese division had produced an excess number of single speed units and found that modifying these units to double speed was more expensive than they had initially thought, so SNK opted to sell them as they were, postponing production of a double speed model until they had sold off the stock of single speed units.

The CDZ was released on December 29, 1995 as the Japanese market replacement for SNK's previous efforts (the "front loader" and the "top loader").

The CDZ was only officially sold in Japan during its production. However, its faster loading times, lack of a "region lock", and the fact that it could play older CD software, made it a popular import item for enthusiasts in both Europe and North America. The system's technical specs are identical to the previous models except that it includes a double-speed CD-ROM drive, and different CD controller circuitry.

Reviewing the Neo Geo CD in late 1995, Next Generation noted SNK's reputation for fun games but argued that their failure to upgrade the Neo Geo system with 3D capabilities would keep them from producing any truly "cutting edge" games, and limit the console to the same small cult following as the Neo Geo AES system although with less expensive games. They gave it 1 1/2 out of 5 stars.

In response to reader inquiries about Neo Geo CD software, GamePro reported in an issue cover dated May 1997 that SNK had quietly discontinued the console by this time.

Technical specifications 

 Main Processor: Motorola 68000 running at 12 MHz. Although the original CPU was designed by Motorola, many of the 68000 CPUs in Neo Geo hardware are manufactured by second-sources. The most common CPU is the TMP68HC000 manufactured by Toshiba.
 Coprocessor: Zilog Z80 running at 4 MHz
 Colors on screen:  4,096
 Colors available:  65,536
 Resolution:  304 x 224
 Max sprites:  384
 Max sprite size:  16 x 512
 Number of planes:  3 (128 sprites per plane as the Neo Geo does not use tiles for its planes like with most game systems at the time)

The system is also capable of reading Redbook standard compact disc audio.

In addition to the multi-AV port (nearly identical to the one used on the Sega Genesis model 1, though they are not interchangeable), all Neo Geo CD models had composite RCA A/V and S-Video out jacks on the rear of the console.

The CD system's 56 Mbit / 7 MB of RAM was split accordingly:

 68000 program memory: 2 MB
 Fix layer memory: 128 KB
 Graphics memory: 4 MB
 Sound sample memory: 1 MB
 Z80 program memory: 64 kB
 VRAM: 512Kb (For graphics attributes)
 SRAM: 2 KB (For high scores / general save data)

Software 

While the Neo Geo CD library consists primarily of ports of MVS and AES titles, there are a few MVS arcade games which were not officially released for the Neo Geo AES and ported instead to the Neo Geo CD. These include Puzzle Bobble, Janshin Densetsu: Quest of Jongmaster (a Mahjong game also released for the PC Engine), Power Spikes II, Neo Drift Out: New Technology, and Pleasure Goal: 5 on 5 Mini Soccer (Futsal: 5-on-5 Mini Soccer).

A few games which were unreleased in MVS and AES formats were also released exclusively for the Neo Geo CD. These include Ironclad: Tesshō Rusha (Chōtetsu Burikingā, BRIKIN'GER), Crossed Swords II, ZinTrick (Oshidashi Zintorikku), ADK World, Neo Geo CD Special, The King of Fighters '96 Neo Collection, Samurai Shodown RPG (Shinsetsu Samurai Spirits: Bushidō Retsuden; an RPG spin-off of the Samurai Shodown series that was also released for the Sony PlayStation and Sega Saturn), and Idol-Mahjong Final Romance 2 (an arcade game which is not an MVS game, but was ported directly to the Neo Geo CD).

Two prototype games were in development:

 Bang² Busters [Bang Bang Busters] (Made by Visco in 2000. Released in 2010 for Neo Geo CD by N.C.I.);
 Treasure of the Caribbean [Caribe no Zaihō] (Made by Face in 1994. Released in 2011 for Neo Geo CD by N.C.I./Le Cortex).

References 

Products introduced in 1994
Computer-related introductions in 1994
1990s toys
Products and services discontinued in 1997
CD-ROM-based consoles
Regionless game consoles
Home video game consoles
Fourth-generation video game consoles
CD
68k-based game consoles